Oleg Gennadyevich Kozhanov (born 5 June 1987) is a Russian former football player.

Club career
He made his debut in the Russian Premier League in 2005 for FC Zenit St. Petersburg.

External links
 
  Profile on the FC Khimki site

1987 births
Footballers from Saint Petersburg
Living people
Russian footballers
Russia under-21 international footballers
FC Zenit Saint Petersburg players
FC Ural Yekaterinburg players
FC Rostov players
FC Khimki players
Russian Premier League players
FC Volga Nizhny Novgorod players
FC KAMAZ Naberezhnye Chelny players
FC Orenburg players
FC Yenisey Krasnoyarsk players
FC SKA-Khabarovsk players
FC Dynamo Saint Petersburg players
Association football forwards